Druga przestrzen ("The Second Space") is the last poetry collection by Czesław Miłosz. It was first published in 2002.

The collection has been studied in the religious context.

References 

2002 poetry books
Polish poetry collections
Poetry by Czesław Miłosz